The Maguire Act of 1895 (enacted February 18, 1895) is a United States Federal statute that abolished the practice of imprisoning sailors who deserted from coastwise vessels.  The act was sponsored by representative James G. Maguire of San Francisco, California.

Before this legislation, a right to leave the ship existed only for a seaman who "correctly" believed his life to be in danger.  This law extended the right in cases where the seaman feared physical abuse from other shipboard personnel.

Notes

References

See also

White Act of 1898
Dingley Act of 1884
Shanghaiing
Maritime history of the United States
Shipping Commissioners Act of 1872

1895 in American law
United States federal admiralty and maritime legislation